The Two EPs is a compilation by Smokey & Miho. The album is composed of the Tempo De Amor EP for the first five tracks and Smokey & Miho EP for remaining five tracks.

Track listing 

 "Tempo De Amor" – 4:26
 "Consolacao" – 4:28
 "Bocoche" – 2:47
 "Canto De Iemanja" – 6:05
 "Canto Do Caboclo Pedra Preta" – 5:36
 "Summer Rain" – 4:14
 "Orixa and Iemanja" – 2:00
 "Blue Glasses" – 4:28
 "Nzage" – 4:42
 "Ocean In Your Eyes – 3:59

- Japanese Edition (人間の土地/Ningen no Tochi )
 "Ocean In Your Eyes – 3:59
 "Summer Rain" – 4:14
 "Orixa and Iemanja" – 2:00
 "Blue Glasses" – 4:28
 "Nzage" – 4:42
 "Canto De Passaro" – 2:07
 "Tempo De Amor" – 4:26
 "Consolacao" – 4:28
 "Bocoche" – 2:47
 "Canto De Iemanja" – 6:05
 "Canto Do Caboclo Pedra Preta" – 5:36
 "Nana" – 2:13

Personnel 
 Don Falzone — bass and percussion
 Smokey Hormel — guitar, percussion, electric bass, marimba, vocals, sampling, shaker, drum Machine, wurlitzer, doussn'gouni, and hand drums.
 Joey Waronker — percussion, drums
 Mauro Refosco — dumbek, percussion, conga, repique, surdo, cuica, shaker, tambur, loop, and Native American drums
 Miho Hatori — triangle, vocals, bass drums, hand drums, shaker, angklung, loop
 Jon Birdsong — tuba, cornet, horn, peck horn

2003 compilation albums
Albums produced by Miho Hatori